Marek Lieberberg (born 7 May 1946) is a German concert promoter, best known for founding and organising the Rock am Ring and Rock im Park festivals.
In 2013, he won the Lifetime Achievement Award at the European Festivals Awards.

As a musician 
He played from 1964 till 1967 in the band The Rangers (consisting of: Ludwig Ickert, Robert Wolf, Marek Lieberberg, Jürgen Kessner & Axel Schürmann). They also named themself The Trembles and The Sad Sack Set.
 On 21 October 1966, they were guests on the German television show Beat Beat Beat. The band is also featured in the book "Die Beat Bible". In 1967, the newspaper Bild wrote articles about them. CBS sued them on 24 February 1967 because the name of a band under CBS contract sounded very similar. They lost the case and gave the money they made by selling their music to CBS. They renamed to "New Rangers" but split up shortly after.

Discography 

 Lovers Of The World Unite (1966)
 The Trembles - Here Comes My Baby / Baby Stop That Playin' Around (7" Single, 1967)
 The Rangers - Black Is Black (7" SIngle 1966)
 The Rangers -  I Found a Love (7" Single, 1967)
 Sad Sack Set - Number One / The World For Us (7" SIngle, 1967)
 The Rangers - The Rangers (LP)
 The Rangers - These Boots Are Made For Walking (1967)
 The Rangers - Very Last Day (1967)
 The Rangers - Look Through Any Window (1967)
 The Rangers - Long Valley Road (1993)

See also
 Live Nation Entertainment

References

External links
 Official website

Living people
Music promoters
20th-century German Jews
1946 births